The 1924 Alabama Crimson Tide baseball team represented the Alabama Crimson Tide of the University of Alabama in the 1924 NCAA baseball season, winning the Southern Conference championship.

Schedule and results

References

Alabama Crimson Tide
Alabama Crimson Tide baseball seasons
Southern Conference baseball champion seasons
1924 in sports in Alabama